Subhash Ganu Bhoir (born 2 June 1958) is an Indian Shiv Sena politician from Thane district, Maharashtra. He is a member of the 13th Maharashtra Legislative Assembly. He represented the Kalyan Rural Assembly Constituency. He is also former Member of Maharashtra Legislative Council.

Positions held
 2010: Elected to Maharashtra Legislative Council
 2014: Elected to Maharashtra Legislative Assembly
 2015: Sampark Pramukh Parbhani, Hingoli district

See also
 List of members of the Maharashtra Legislative Council
 Kalyan Lok Sabha Constituency

References

External links
 Official Website
 Shiv Sena Home Page
  महाराष्ट्रावर भगवा फडकविण्यासाठी कामाला लागा

1958 births
Shiv Sena politicians
People from Thane
Living people
Members of the Maharashtra Legislative Council
Marathi politicians
Nationalist Congress Party politicians from Maharashtra
Maharashtra MLAs 2014–2019